The 715th Independent Reconnaissance Squadron (Serbo-Croatian:  / 715. самостална извиђачка ескадрила) was an aviation squadron of Yugoslav Air Force formed in December, 1949 by order from July 24, same year at Pleso airfield.

Squadron was part of 37th Aviation Division. By war timetable it supposed to be part of 103rd Reconnaissance Aviation Regiment.  It was equipped with Soviet-made Petlyakov Pe-2 bomber aircraft.

By February, 1952 squadron was disbanded and with 184th Light Night Bomber Aviation Regiment it has formed 184th Reconnaissance Aviation Regiment.

Equipment
Petlyakov Pe-2

References

Yugoslav Air Force squadrons
Military units and formations established in 1949